Captain Jones may refer to:

Christopher Jones (Mayflower captain) (c. 1570–1622), captain of the 1620 voyage of the Pilgrim ship Mayflower
Dan Jones (Mormon) (1810–1862), influential Welsh missionary
John Paul Jones (1747–1792), the United States' first well-known naval commander
Davy Jones (Pirates of the Caribbean), fictional captain of the Flying Dutchman